In Greek mythology, Adicia or Adikia was the goddess and personification of injustice and wrong-doing.

Family
Adikia's family are not clear in the Greek mythological tradition. Nyx is thought to possibly be her mother, but Eris is another possibility. Eris is the goddess of discord and strife, so it would make sense if she were also the mother of Adikia. In some myths, the parents of Eris are Zeus and Hera, while in others her parents are Erebos and Nyx. Most myths say that Eris was only born to Nyx. Nyx, in turn, is the goddess of night. Nyx was considered an extremely powerful goddess that even Zeus feared.

Mythology 
Adikia was usually represented on the chest of Cypselus as a hideous, barbaric woman covered in tattoos being dragged by her opposite, Dike, the goddess of justice with one hand, while in the other she held a staff which she beat her with or she is depicted being throttled by Dike."A beautiful woman is punishing an ugly one, choking her with one hand and with the other striking her with a staff. It is Justice (Dike) who thus treats Injustice (Adikia). "

Notes

Reference 

 Bell, Robert E., Women of Classical Mythology: A Biographical Dictionary. ABC-Clio. 1991. .

Pausanias, Description of Greece with an English Translation by W.H.S. Jones, Litt. D., and H.A. Ormerod, M.A., in 4 Volumes. Cambridge, MA, Harvard University Press; London, William Heinemann Ltd. 1918. . Online version at the Perseus Digital Library
Pausanias, Graeciae Descriptio. 3 vols. Leipzig, Teubner. 1903.  Greek text available at the Perseus Digital Library.

Greek goddesses
Personifications in Greek mythology
Injustice